The Government of the 15th Dáil or the 7th Government of Ireland (2 June 1954 – 20 March 1957) was the government of Ireland formed after the general election held on 18 May 1954. Commonly known as the Second Inter-Party Government, it was a minority government of Fine Gael, the Labour Party and Clann na Talmhan. Clann na Poblachta, which had been in the First Inter-Party Government (1948–51) with these parties, supported the government but did form part of it.

The 7th Government lasted for  days.

7th Government of Ireland

Nomination of Taoiseach
The 15th Dáil first met on 2 June 1954. In the debate on the nomination of Taoiseach, Fianna Fáil leader and outgoing Taoiseach Éamon de Valera and former Taoiseach John A. Costello of Fine Gael were both proposed. The nomination of de Valera was defeated with 66 votes cast in favour and 78 against, while the nomination of Costello was approved by 79 to 66. Costello was appointed as Taoiseach by President Seán T. O'Kelly.

Members of the Government
The Ministers of the Government were proposed by the Taoiseach and approved by the Dáil. They were appointed by the president on the same day.

Parliamentary Secretaries
On 3 June 1954, the Government appointed the Parliamentary Secretaries on the nomination of the Taoiseach.

Foreign Policy
Ireland joined the United Nations in 1955.

Dissolution of the Dáil
The government ended when the Clann na Poblachta withdrew its support in 1957. Fine Gael and Labour had also both lost seats in by-elections to Fianna Fáil the previous year. Costello sought a dissolution of the Dáil on 4 February 1957 which was granted by the president, leading to a general election on 9 March 1957.

See also
Dáil Éireann
Constitution of Ireland
Politics of the Republic of Ireland

References

Coalition governments of Ireland
Governments of Ireland
1954 establishments in Ireland
1957 disestablishments in Ireland
Cabinets established in 1954
Cabinets disestablished in 1957
15th Dáil